John Norman Frank Robertson (May 8, 1929 – February 19, 2020) was a Canadian sailor. He competed at the 1948 Summer Olympics in the Swallow class and at the 1952 Summer Olympics in the Dragon class and finished seventh-tenth.

References

1929 births
2020 deaths
Canadian male sailors (sport)
Olympic sailors of Canada
Sailors at the 1948 Summer Olympics – Swallow
Sailors at the 1952 Summer Olympics – Dragon